Exarchate of Istanbul  may refer to the following Ecclesiastical pre-diocesan jurisdictions with episcopal see in Istanbul (formerly Constantinople) in modern Turkey :

 Greek Catholic Apostolic Exarchate of Istanbul (Byzantine Rite, Greek language)
 Melkite Catholic Patriarchal Exarchate of Istanbul (Byzantine Rite, Arabic language)

See also
 Patriarchal Exarchate of Jerusalem (disambiguation)